The 1980 Open Championship was a men's major golf championship and the 109th Open Championship, held from 17–20 July at Muirfield Golf Links in Gullane, Scotland. Tom Watson won his third Open Championship, four strokes ahead of runner-up Lee Trevino. It was the fourth of Watson's eight major titles; he won two additional Opens in 1982 and 1983. It was Watson's first win in a major in three years.

Trevino, 40, had won the last Open played at Muirfield in 1972, successfully defending his 1971 title and ending the grand slam bid of Jack Nicklaus. Nicklaus, also 40, tied for fourth. He won at Muirfield in 1966 and was runner-up by a stroke in 1972.

This was the first Open scheduled to end on a Sunday, with a Thursday start. The Open previously began on Wednesday and ended on Saturday. Prior to 1966, the final two rounds were scheduled for Friday. In 1970 and 1975, 18-hole playoffs were held on Sunday.

Past champions in the field

Made both cuts

Missed the second cut

Missed the first cut

Round summaries

First round
Thursday, 17 July 1980

Second round
Friday, 18 July 1980

Amateurs: Sigel (+2), Rafferty (+9), McLean (+10), Mitchell (+10), Evans (+11), Gallagher (+12), Way (+12), Boxall (+13), McEvoy (+13), Deeble (+14), McCathie (+17), Hay (+19)

Third round
Saturday, 19 July 1980

Amateurs: Sigel (+5)

Final round
Sunday, 20 July 1980

Amateurs: Sigel (+7)Source:

References

External links
Muirfield 1980 (Official site)
109th Open Championship - Muirfield (European Tour)
1980 Open Championship (GolfCompendium.com)

The Open Championship
Golf tournaments in Scotland
Open Championship
Open Championship
Open Championship